Catherine Lloyd Burns is an American actress and author. She is best known for her role as Caroline Miller, the title character's teacher in the television series Malcolm in the Middle.

Acting
She has appeared in multiple television shows, and was a regular on Partners and LateLine. She played Caroline Miller, Malcolm's "overly earnest" teacher, in Malcolm in the Middle. Burns has appeared in numerous feature films and the independent film Everything Put Together. Along with her role, she was a cowriter of the independent film Everything Put Together. She has also worked in theater with New York's Naked Angels.

Writing
The film Everything Put Together was written by a number of authors, including Catherine and her husband. It was nominated for the Grand Jury Prize at the Sundance Film Festivals in 2000. In 2001, it was nominated for an Independent Spirit Award as the best feature made for under $500,000. Director Marc Forster won Independent Spirit's Someone to Watch Award.

Her first book is It Hit Me Like a Ton of Bricks, which was published by Farrar, Straus and Giroux in 2007. The book is a biography, from the point of view of the author. It centers around personal memoirs, and family relationships.

Personal life
Burns is Jewish,
She is married to Adam Forgash, with one daughter, and they reside in New York. Her late father, Lloyd Burns, worked in entertainment, and her Canadian-born mother, Red Burns (née Gennis), founded the Interactive Telecommunications Program (NYU). Her husband is a writer and producer.

Filmography

Film

Television

Video games

Bibliography
It Hit Me Like a Ton of Bricks: A Memoir of a Mother and Daughter, North Point Press, 2006, 
The Good, the Bad & the Beagle, Farrar, Straus and Giroux, 2014, 
The Half-True Lies of Cricket Cohen, Farrar, Straus and Giroux Books for Young Readers, 2017,

References

External links
Catherine Lloyd Burns website

20th-century American actresses
21st-century American actresses
Actresses from New York City
American biographers
American women biographers
American film actresses
American people of Canadian descent
American television actresses
Living people
Historians from New York (state)
Year of birth missing (living people)